Yulia Sergeevna Peresild (born 5 September 1984) is a Russian stage and film actress. She is the first professional actress to act in outer space after her spaceflight to the ISS in October 2021.

Early life
Peresild was born in Pskov, Russian SFSR, Soviet Union. Her father was an icon painter and mother a kindergarten worker. Her surname comes from her Estonian paternal great-grandparents, who were deported to Russia.

After school, she entered the Faculty of Russian Philology of the Pskov State Pedagogical Institute, but after studying for only one year, she went to Moscow and entered a theater college. In 2006, she graduated from the acting department of the directing department of the Russian Academy of Theatre Arts.

Career
Her acting debut was the role of Natasha Kublakova in the 2003 television series , directed by Aleksandr Baranov. Her first big work in film was the role of Olya Rodyashina in the drama film The Bride (2006) directed by Elyor Ishmukhamedov, and Captive (2008) directed by Alexei Uchitel. However, her real breakthrough roles included the main role of Sofia in the drama The Edge (2010) directed by Alexei Uchitel, the television series Santa Lucia (2012), and the mystical thriller Sonnentau (2012). Peresild became well known after playing supporting roles in In the Fog (2012) directed by Sergei Loznitsa, and she played the role of Soviet Sniper Lyudmila Pavlichenko in the 2015 biographical war film Battle for Sevastopol.

Filming in outer space
She was selected as a member of the crew of Soyuz MS-19, which launched on 5 October 2021, in order to shoot the film The Challenge with Klim Shipenko. Her name was chosen from a shortlist of 20 actresses, and was announced on 14 May 2021. On 17 October, she returned to Earth on board Soyuz MS-18.

Personal life
Peresild was in a relationship with Russian film director Alexei Uchitel with whom she has two daughters, Anna (born 2009) and Maria (born 2012).

She is a founding member of the charity foundation Galchonok, which works to provide treatment for children with organic central nervous system disorders.

Honors

President of Russia's award for young artists (2013)
The Golden Eagle award for the best actress in a supporting role (in The Edge, 2010)
Best actress award at the first BRICS Film Festival (2015)
Best actress award at the fifth Beijing International Film Festival (2015)
The Golden Eagle award for the best actress (in Battle for Sevastopol, 2016)

Selected filmography

Film

Television

References

External links

 

1984 births
Living people
People from Pskov
Russian film actresses
Russian television actresses
Russian stage actresses
Russian people of Estonian descent
Actresses from Moscow
21st-century Russian actresses
Honored Artists of the Russian Federation
Russian Academy of Theatre Arts alumni
Russian cosmonauts
Spaceflight participants